Salvador de Mujeres (Salvador:A Knockout Lover) is a 2010 Venezuelan telenovela produced by Venevisión. The telenovela was entirely shot in Colombia

Carlos Guillermo Haydon and Alejandra Sandoval star as the main protagonists with Ruddy Rodríguez portraying the main antagonist.

Plot
Salvador “El Tigre” Valdez is a successful boxing champion whose career is ruined after he refuses to sign a deal with a mafia kingpin. As an act of revenge, he is framed so that he loses the national boxing championship and he is suspended from boxing for ten years. Now, Salvador is forced to seek other forms of income. He gets a job in a gym owned by Josefina Álvarez, a powerful and sophisticated woman who offers him a proposal he is forced to accept due to his serious financial problems. Salvador becomes a paid gigolo for some of the richest women in the city, and he now moves from being a champion in the boxing ring to being a champion in the bedroom.

However, Salvador's main goal is to conquer the heart of Socorro Alvarez Castillo, Josefina's daughter. Socorro is a beauty queen and model stuck in a failed marriage, and he views Salvador as uncouth and beneath her standards. But with time, she also begins to fall in love with him. However, their love will be threatened by Josefina, who has also fallen in love with Salvador, her own creation and manipulation tool.

Cast
 Carlos Guillermo Haydon as "Salvador Valdez".
 Alejandra Sandoval as Socorro Alvavez Castillo.
 Ruddy Rodríguez as Josefina Álvarez. 
 Roberto Vander as Julio César.
 Carina Cruz as Lula.
 Yul Bürkle as Manuel.
 Franklin Virgüez as Don Carlos.
 Orlando Miguel as Felipe.
 Diana Ángel as Charo.
 Alberto Quintero as Fernando.
 Maleja Restrepo as Bárbara.
 Pilar Álvarez as María.
 Vicente Tepedino as Gonzalo.
 Pedro Rendón as Andres''.
 Katherine Escobar as "Isabel".
 Gabriel Ochoa as "Ramiro Alvarez Castillo".
 Ana Bolena Mesa as "Mercedes".
 Shirley Marulanda as "Elena".
 Morella Zuleta as "Victoria".
 Helga Díaz

References

External links

2010 Colombian television series debuts
2010 Colombian television series endings
Spanish-language telenovelas
2010 telenovelas
Venevisión telenovelas
2010 Venezuelan television series debuts
2010 Venezuelan television series endings
Venezuelan telenovelas
Television shows set in Venezuela
Television shows set in Colombia